Bruce Mather (born May 9, 1939) is a Canadian composer, pianist, and writer who is particularly known for his contributions to contemporary classical music. One of the most notable composers of microtonal music, he was awarded the Jules Léger Prize twice, first in 1979 for his Musique pour Champigny and again in 1993 for Yquem. Some of his other awards include the Composers, Authors and Publishers Association of Canada's Micheline Coulombe Saint-Marcoux prize in 1987 for Barbaresco and the Serge Garant Prize from the Émile Nelligan Foundation in 2000.

Mather is an associate of the Canadian Music Centre and a member of the Canadian League of Composers. As a writer he has contributed works to numerous musical journals and publications, including authoring the articles on Serge Garant, François Morel, and Gilles Tremblay in the Dictionary of Contemporary Music. He has taught on the music faculties of the University of Toronto (1964–1966), the University of Montreal (1970–1973), the Paris Conservatoire (1978–1979) and McGill University (1966–2001). His notable pupils include, Marc Patch, Peter Allen, John Burke, Paul Crawford, Jacques Desjardins, José Evangelista, Anthony Genge, Richard Hunt, Denis Lorrain, John Oliver, François Rose, Ronald Bruce Smith, Donald Steven, and Alexander Tilley.

As a pianist Mather has displayed a strong commitment to performing new music by himself and by other contemporary composers. He has performed in many major performance venues and music festivals, often appearing with his wife, pianist Pierrette LePage, in duo-piano works. The husband and wife team have also partnered on several recordings. He served as director of the Société de musique contemporaine du Québec from 1966–1981 and later served as treasurer.

Education
Born in Toronto, Mather began composing music as a young child. At the age of 10 he won a prize in the 1949 Composers, Authors and Publishers Association of Canada composition competition. In 1952 he entered The Royal Conservatory of Music where he studied piano with Alberto Guerrero, Earle Moss, and Alexander Uninsky and music theory and composition with Godfrey Ridout, Oskar Morawetz, and John Weinzweig. In 1957 he matriculated to the University of Toronto where he earned a Bachelor of Music degree in 1959.

Mather attended the Aspen Music Festival and School in the summers of 1957 and 1958 through a scholarship provided by the Women's Musical Club of Toronto and the Beta Sigma Phi International Sorority. While there Alexander Uninsky introduced the young composer to Darius Milhaud and Milhaud quickly became one of his more important mentors. He continued to study with Milhaud and with Simone Plé-Caussade, Lazare Lévy, and Olivier Messiaen at the Paris Conservatoire from 1959-1961. In 1964 he received a Master of Music from Stanford University where he was a pupil of Leland Smith and Roy Harris, and in 1967 he earned a Doctor of Music from the University of Toronto.

Music
Mather is a composer of orchestral, chamber, vocal, and piano works. A disciple of Ivan Wyschnegradsky, his music often employs microtonal scales. Though he was distrustful towards microtonal music since he heard Alois Haba's Music, his meeting with Wyschnegradsky in the seventies was crucial for his aesthetic and his use of microtonal scales. As a pianist, he and his pianist wife, Pierret Mather, have performed many of Wyschnegradsky's pieces.

In his composition he still uses the famous Wyschnegrasky's principle of non-octavic spaces. He wrote many works using this technique and notably his Poème du délire ("Poem of Delirium") a tribute to Alexander Scriabin (as a reference to his famous Poem of Ecstasy and Poem of Fire), an influential figure for him and Wyschnegradsky. His compositions are also strongly influenced by his love of poetry and wine.

Works

Stage
La princesse blanche (opera), 2 sopranos, baritone, bass, small orchestra (16 players), 1993

Orchestral
Concerto, piano, small orchestra, 1958;
Elegy, alto saxophone, string orchestra, 1959 (also arranged for alto saxophone, piano);
Symphonic Ode, 1964;
Orchestral Piece 1967, large orchestra, 1966–67;
Ombres, 1967;
Music for Vancouver, small orchestra (16-17 players), 1969;
Musique pour Rouen, 12 strings, 1971;
Musigny, large orchestra (89 players), 1980;
Scherzo, small orchestra (18 players), 1987–88;
Dialogue pour Trio Basso et Orchestre, viola, cello, double bass, orchestra, 1988;
Tallbrem Variations, 5 percussion, orchestra, 1994;
Quarts de Chaume, string orchestra, 1998

Chamber music
Sonata, violin, piano, 1957;
Elegy, alto saxophone, piano, 1959 (arrangement of work for alto saxophone, string orchestra);
Étude, clarinet, 1962;
Music for Organ, Horn and Gongs, 1973;
Mandola, mandolin, piano, 1974;
Eine kleine Bläsermusik, flute, oboe, clarinet, French horn, bassoon, 1975;
Clos de Vougeot, 4 percussion, 1977;
Ausone: 
Version A, flute, 1979;
Version B, flute, 2 harps, 1979;
Version C, flute, 2 harps, 2 guitars, 2 violins, 2 violas, 2 celli, 1979;
Coulée de serrant, harp, piano, 1980;
Sassicaia, clarinet, piano, 1981; Gattinara, viola, percussion, 1982;
Elegy, flute (+ alto flute), cello, piano, percussion, 1983;
Barbaresco, viola, cello, double bass, 1984;
Clos d'audignac, marimba, 3 percussion, 1984;
Senorio de Sarria, 2 guitars (tuned a quarter-tone apart), 1985;
Vouvray, oboe, harp, 1986;
Viola Duet, 2 violas, 1987;
Vega Sicilia, guitar, ensemble (harp, viola, cello, marimba), 1989;
Yquem, 4 pianos, 4 ondes Martenot, 1991;
Romance, bassoon, synthesizer, 1992;
Standing Wave, clarinet, cello, piano, percussion, 1994;
Advanced Harmony, wind ensemble, 1995;
Quintette, clarinet, string quartet, 1995;
Duo basso, bass flute, bass oboe, 1996;
Quatre Études, cimbalom, marimba, 1996;
Tempranillo, specially-tuned guitar, 1997;
Hoya de Cadenas, alto flute, quarter-tone guitar, 1997;
Doisy Daëne, flute, piano, 1997;
Quinta da Camarate, specially-tuned guitar, 1998;
Violin Duet, 2 violins, 1998;
Bourgueil, clarinet, violin, cello, piano, percussion, 1999;
Quintet for Saxophones and Piano, 1999;
Sancerre, harp, harpsichord, 1999;
Four Études, 6 percussion, 2001
In memoriam Bengt Hambraeus, theorbo, 2001
Trio, violin, cello, piano, 2002
Deux Pièces pour Ondes Martenot et piano en seizièmes de ton, sixteenth-tone piano, Ondes Martenot, 2004
65 Takte für Robert Aitken, 2 flutes, 2004
Music for San Francisco, cello, ensemble (oboe, French horn, specially-tuned harp, violin, viola, piano), 2005
For Amie Watson, vibraphone, tubular bells, 13 cowbells (1 player), 2006

Choral
Lament for Pasiphaë, soprano, baritone, small mixed chorus, orchestra, 1962;
Counting the Beats, soprano, baritone, small mixed chorus, orchestra, 1962;
La lune mince… (text by Paul Valéry), divided mixed chorus, 1965;
Two Stanford Songs, mixed chorus, 1988

Vocal
Two Songs, bass-baritone, orchestra, 1956;
Venice, soprano, clarinet, cello, piano, 1957;
Lost Love, soprano, string orchestra, 1958;
The Finding of Love, soprano, string orchestra, 1958;
Cycle Rilke, tenor, guitar, 1959;
The Song of Blodeuwedd, baritone, orchestra (harp, piano, timpani, percussion, strings), 1961;
Sick Love, soprano, orchestra, 1961;
Orphée (text by Paul Valéry), soprano, piano, percussion, 1963;
Madrigal I (text by Hector de Saint-Denys Garneau), soprano, alto, flute, harp, mandolin, violin, cello, 1967;
Madrigal II (text by Hector de Saint-Denys Garneau), soprano, alto, flute, harp, violin, viola, cello, 1968;
Madrigal III (text by Hector de Saint-Denys Garneau), alto, harp, piano, marimba, 1971;
Madrigal V (text by Hector de Saint-Denys Garneau), soprano, alto, small orchestra (17 players), 1973, revised 1980;
Au château de Pompairain, mezzo-soprano, orchestra, 1976;
Musique pour Champigny, soprano, mezzo-soprano, alto, B-flat clarinet, French horn, harp, piano, percussion, 1976 (Winner, Jules *Léger Prize for New Chamber Music, 1979); Les grandes fontaines (text by Anne Hébert), soprano, piano, 1981;
Un cri qui durerait la mer (text by Marie France Rose), bass-baritone, piano, 1985;
Travaux de nuit, baritone, piano, 1990 (also arranged for baritone, orchestra, 1990);
Des laines de lumière (text by Gatien Lapointe), bass-baritone, 2 quarter-tone pianos, 1996;
La voix d'oiseau, coloratura soprano, piano, 1998;
Trois Poèmes de Gatien Lapointe, voice, piano, 1998;
Onze Poèmes pour la main gauche, soprano, piano, 2000

Piano
Smaragdin, 1960;
Like Snow, 1960;
Mystras, 1962;
Fantasy, 1964;
Sonata, 2 pianos, 1969–70;
In memoriam Alexander Uninsky, 1974;
Régime 11, Type A, 2 pianos (tuned a quarter-tone apart), 1978;
Poème du délire, 3 specially-tuned pianos, 1982;
Hommage à Carrillo, sixteenth-tone piano, 1996;
D'après un cri, 1996;
Régime 17, third-tone piano, 1997;
Eight Études, sixteenth-tone piano, 2000
In memoriam Gordon Sheppard, sixteenth-tone piano, 2 pianos (tuned a quarter-tone apart), 2006
Hommage à Wyschnegradsky, 2009

Organ
Six Études, 1982;
Études Nos. 7-8, 1993
Ardennes, 2002
Cinq Pièces faciles, organ 4 hands, 2002

Harpsichord
Saumur, quarter-tone harpsichord, 1990

Electroacoustic
Madrigal IV (text by Hector de Saint-Denys Garneau), soprano, flute, piano, tape, 1972;
Barolo, cello, tape, 1977;
Aux victimes de la guerre de Vendée (1793), French horn, 2 pianos, tape, 1990

External links
 Text by Mather explaining his music and his history(fr)

References

1939 births
Living people
20th-century classical composers
21st-century classical composers
Academic staff of the Conservatoire de Paris
Aspen Music Festival and School alumni
Conservatoire de Paris alumni
Canadian classical composers
Canadian male classical composers
Jules Léger Prize for New Chamber Music winners
Academic staff of McGill University
Microtonal musicians
Musicians from Toronto
Canadian opera composers
The Royal Conservatory of Music alumni
Stanford University alumni
Academic staff of the Université de Montréal
University of Toronto alumni
Academic staff of the University of Toronto
20th-century Canadian composers
Pupils of Darius Milhaud